Dharitri is an Indian daily newspaper published in the Odia language from the capital city of Bhubaneswar. The newspaper was founded on 24 November 1974 by the Samajbadi Society in Bhubaneswar.

Orissa Post
Orissa Post is an Indian English-language daily newspaper started  by Dharitri Group in 2011. It is published from Bhubaneswar, Sambalpur, Angul, Rayagada in Odisha. The editor of the newspaper is Tathagata Satpathy.

References

External links 

 Official website
 Dharitri E-Paper

Odia-language newspapers
Daily newspapers published in India
Publications established in 1974
Mass media in Bhubaneswar
1974 establishments in Orissa